The 44th New York State Legislature, consisting of the New York State Senate and the New York State Assembly, met from November 7, 1820, to April 3, 1821, during the fourth year of DeWitt Clinton's governorship, in Albany.

Background
Under the provisions of the New York Constitution of 1777, amended by the Constitutional Convention of 1801, 32 Senators were elected on general tickets in the four senatorial districts for four-year terms. They were divided into four classes, and every year eight Senate seats came up for election. Assemblymen were elected countywide on general tickets to a one-year term, the whole Assembly being renewed annually.

In 1797, Albany was declared the State capital, and all subsequent Legislatures have been meeting there ever since. In 1818, the Legislature enacted that future Legislatures meet on the first Tuesday of January of each year unless called earlier by the governor.

On January 18, 1820, a caucus of 64 Bucktail legislators nominated U.S. Vice President Daniel D. Tompkins for Governor and State Senator Benjamin Mooers for Lieutenant Governor. A meeting of citizens at Albany nominated Gov. DeWitt Clinton and Lt. Gov. John Tayler for re-election. The Federalists did not nominate candidates for Governor or Lieutenant Governor, and the party began to disband: the vast majority of them supported Clinton, a minority—calling themselves the "High-minded Federalists" (among them William A. Duer and John A. King)—supported Tompkins and joined the Bucktails.

At this time the politicians were divided into two opposing political parties: the Federalists and the Democratic-Republicans. The Democratic-Republican Party was split into two factions: the Clintonians (supporters of Gov. DeWitt Clinton) and the Bucktails (led by Martin Van Buren, and including the Tammany Hall organization in New York City).

Elections
The State election was held from April 25 to 27, 1820. Gov. DeWitt Clinton and Lt. Gov. John Tayler were re-elected.

Senators Walter Bowne (Southern D.) and Ephraim Hart (Western D.) were re-elected. John Lefferts (Southern D.), William C. Bouck, John J. Miller, Tilly Lynde (all three Middle D.), Elijah Miles ( Western D.), and Assemblyman Oliver Forward (Western D.) were also elected to the Senate. Hart, Miles and Forward were Clintonians, the other five Bucktails.

Sessions
The Legislature met at the Old State Capitol in Albany on November 7, 1820, to elect presidential electors; and adjourned on November 20.

Peter Sharpe (Buckt.) was elected Speaker with 69 votes against 52 for John C. Spencer (Clint.), the Speaker of the previous session. Dirck L. Vanderheyden was elected Clerk of the Assembly with 63 votes against 62 for the incumbent Aaron Clark.

On November 8, a Bucktail Council of Appointment was chosen, with a vote of 71 to 54. However this Council did not meet before January 1821, when the previous Council's term expired. Then they removed almost all Clintonian office-holders and appointed Bucktails instead.

On November 9, the Legislature chose 29 electors, all Bucktails: William Floyd, Henry Rutgers, Abel Huntington, Edward Leverich, Isaac Lawrence, John Targee, Jacob Odell, Peter Waring, Edward P. Livingston, David Hammond, Peter Millikin, Mark Spencer, Benjamin Knower, Gilbert Eddy, Howell Gardner, John Baker, John Walworth, Daniel McDougal, Seth Wetmore, Latham A. Burrows, Farrand Stranahan, Henry Wager, Elisha Farnham, Jonathan Collins, Samuel Nelson, William B. Rochester, Charles Thompson, Philetus Swift, James Brisban. Floyd and Wetmore did not attend the meeting of the electoral college, and Martin Van Buren and William I. Dodge were appointed to fill the vacancies. They cast their votes for James Monroe and Daniel D. Tompkins.

On November 18, the Legislature passed a bill calling for a convention with unlimited powers to amend the State Constitution. Two days later, the Council of Revision rejected the bill: Chancellor James Kent and Chief Justice Ambrose Spencer voted against it; Judges Joseph C. Yates and John Woodworth for it; and Gov. DeWitt Clinton broke the tie voting against it.

The Legislature met for the regular session on January 9, 1821, and adjourned on April 3.

At the beginning of this session, the Legislature passed a bill to submit the question, whether a Constitutional Convention should be called, to the people at the next annual State election, to be held in April 1821. The people answered in the affirmative, delegates to the New York State Constitutional Convention of 1821 were elected in June, and the Convention met from August to November 1821. The new Constitution was adopted by popular vote in January 1822.

On January 29, the Legislature appointed Benjamin Knower (Buckt.) to succeed Gerrit L. Dox as New York State Treasurer.

On February 6, the Legislature elected Martin Van Buren (Buckt.) to succeed Nathan Sanford (Clint.) as U.S. Senator from New York for a term beginning on March 4, 1821.

On March 21, the Legislature added State Senator William C. Bouck (Buckt.) to the Erie Canal Commission.

State Senate

Districts
The Southern District (6 seats) consisted of Dutchess, Kings, New York, Putnam, Queens, Richmond, Rockland, Suffolk and Westchester counties.
The Middle District (9 seats) consisted of Albany, Chenango, Columbia, Delaware, Greene, Orange, Otsego, Schoharie, Sullivan and Ulster counties.
The Eastern District (8 seats) consisted of Clinton, Essex, Franklin, Hamilton, Herkimer, Jefferson, Lewis, Montgomery, Rensselaer,  St. Lawrence, Saratoga, Schenectady, Warren and Washington counties.
The Western District (9 seats) consisted of Allegany, Broome, Cattaraugus, Cayuga, Chautauqua, Cortland, Genesee, Madison,  Niagara, Oneida, Onondaga, Ontario, Oswego, Seneca, Steuben, Tioga and Tompkins counties.

Note: There are now 62 counties in the State of New York. The counties which are not mentioned in this list had not yet been established, or sufficiently organized, the area being included in one or more of the abovementioned counties.

Members
The asterisk (*) denotes members of the previous Legislature who continued in office as members of this Legislature. Oliver Forward changed from the Assembly to the Senate.

Employees
Clerk: John F. Bacon

State Assembly

Districts

Albany County (4 seats)
Allegany and Steuben counties (2 seats)
Broome County (1 seat)
Cattaraugus, Chautauqua and Niagara counties (2 seats)
Cayuga County (3 seats)
Chenango County (3 seats)
Clinton and Franklin counties (1 seat)
Columbia County (4 seats)
Cortland County (1 seat)
Delaware County (2 seats)
Dutchess County (5 seats)
Essex County (1 seat)
Genesee County (3 seats)
Greene County (2 seats)
Hamilton and Montgomery counties (5 seats)
Herkimer County (3 seats)
Jefferson County (2 seats)
Kings County (1 seat)
Lewis County (1 seat)
Madison County (3 seats)
The City and County of New York (11 seats)
Oneida and Oswego counties (5 seats)
Onondaga County (4 seats)
Ontario County (7 seats)
Orange County (4 seats)
Otsego County (5 seats)
Putnam County (1 seat)
Queens County (3 seats)
Rensselaer County (5 seats)
Richmond County (1 seat)
Rockland County (1 seat)
St. Lawrence County (1 seat)
Saratoga County (4 seats)
Schenectady County (2 seats)
Schoharie County (3 seats)
Seneca County (2 seats)
Suffolk County (3 seats)
Sullivan and Ulster counties (4 seats)
Tioga County (1 seat)
Tompkins County (2 seats)
Warren and Washington counties (5 seats)
Westchester County (3 seats)

Note: There are now 62 counties in the State of New York. The counties which are not mentioned in this list had not yet been established, or sufficiently organized, the area being included in one or more of the abovementioned counties.

Assemblymen
The asterisk (*) denotes members of the previous Legislature who continued as members of this Legislature.

Employees
Clerk: Dirck L. Vanderheyden
Sergeant-at-Arms: Henry Fryer
Doorkeeper: Henry Bates
Assistant Doorkeeper: Willard Smith

Notes

Sources
The New York Civil List compiled by Franklin Benjamin Hough (Weed, Parsons and Co., 1858) [see pg. 108f for Senate districts; pg. 124 for senators; pg. 148f for Assembly districts; pg. 196f for assemblymen; pg. 321 and 326 for presidential election]
The History of Political Parties in the State of New-York, from the Ratification of the Federal Constitution to 1840 by Jabez D. Hammond (4th ed., Vol. 1, H. & E. Phinney, Cooperstown, 1846; pages 531-570)
Election result Assembly, Albany Co. at project "A New Nation Votes", compiled by Phil Lampi, hosted by Tufts University Digital Library
Partial election result Assembly, Allegany and Steuben Co. at project "A New Nation Votes" [gives only votes of Allegany Co.]
Partial election result Assembly, Allegany and Steuben Co. at project "A New Nation Votes" [gives only votes of Steuben Co.]
Election result Assembly, Broome Co. at project "A New Nation Votes"
Partial election result Assembly, Cattaraugus, Chautauqua and Niagara Co. at project "A New Nation Votes" [gives only votes from Cattaraugus Co.]
Partial election result Assembly, Cattaraugus, Chautauqua and Niagara Co. at project "A New Nation Votes" [gives only votes from Chautauqua Co.]
Partial election result Assembly, Cattaraugus, Chautauqua and Niagara Co. at project "A New Nation Votes" [gives only votes from Niagara Co.]
Election result Assembly, Greene Co. at project "A New Nation Votes"
Election result Assembly, Kings Co. at project "A New Nation Votes"
Election result Assembly, Putnam Co. at project "A New Nation Votes"
Election result Assembly, Queens Co. at project "A New Nation Votes"
Election result Assembly, Richmond Co. at project "A New Nation Votes"
Election result Assembly, St. Lawrence Co. at project "A New Nation Votes"
Election result Assembly, Schenectady Co. at project "A New Nation Votes"
Election result Assembly, Schoharie Co. at project "A New Nation Votes"
Election result Assembly, Sullivan and Ulster Co. at project "A New Nation Votes"
Partial election result Senate, Southern D. at project "A New Nation Votes" [gives only votes from Kings, Putnam, Queens and Richmond Co.]
Partial election result Senate, Middle D. at project "A New Nation Votes" [gives only votes of Greene, Schoharie, Sullivan and Ulster Co.]
Partial election result Senate, Western D. at project "A New Nation Votes" [gives only votes of Allegany, Broome, Cattaraugus and Steuben Co.]
Election result Speaker at project "A New Nation Votes"
Election result Assembly Clerk at project "A New Nation Votes"
Election result Council of Appointment at project "A New Nation Votes"

044
1820 in New York (state)
1821 in New York (state)
1820 U.S. legislative sessions